Later That Evening is an album by German double bassist and composer Eberhard Weber recorded in 1982 and released on the ECM label.

Reception
The Allmusic review by Scott Yanow awarded the album 4 stars, stating, "This is one of bassist Eberhard Weber's more stimulating ECM releases, due in part to his colorful sidemen".

Track listing
All compositions by Eberhard Weber.
 "Maurizius" – 8:11 
 "Death in the Carwash" – 16:39 
 "Often in the Open" – 11:35 
 "Later That Evening" – 6:37

Personnel
Eberhard Weber – bass
Paul McCandless – soprano saxophone, oboe, English horn, bass clarinet
Bill Frisell – guitar
Lyle Mays – piano
Michael Di Pasqua – drums, percussion

References

ECM Records albums
Eberhard Weber albums
1982 albums
Albums produced by Manfred Eicher